Bjørn Flatgård (born September 13, 1949) is a Norwegian businessperson.

He is the deputy chair of Aker Solutions and chair of SalMar.

He was educated with a Master of Science in Chemical Engineering from the Norwegian Institute of Technology, and also holds a degree from BI Norwegian Business School. He has been vice president for Hafslund Nycomed and Nycomed, and CEO of Nycomed Pharma. From 1996 to 2007 he was the CEO of Elopak.

References

1949 births
Living people
Norwegian Institute of Technology alumni
BI Norwegian Business School alumni
Aker Group people
Place of birth missing (living people)
Norwegian chairpersons of corporations